Store Rauddalseggi or Store Rauddalseggje is a mountain on the border of Luster Municipality in Vestland county and Lom Municipality in Innlandet county, Norway. The mountain is surrounded by several other notable mountains including Storådalshøi and Høgtunga to the east; Snøholstinden to the south; Mjølkedalstinden to the west; Austre Høgvagltinden and Høgvagltindene to the northwest; Skarddalstinden to the north; Skarddalseggi and Semeltinden to the northeast.

The first ascent of Store Rauddalseggi was on 17 August 1906 by Ferdinand Schjelderup and Agnes Jakhelln.

See also
List of mountains of Norway by height

References

Jotunheimen
Lom, Norway
Luster, Norway
Mountains of Vestland
Mountains of Innlandet